On the life’s way is the social-politic oriented newspaper published in the Chuvashia (Russia).

History
The first issue of the newspaper was published on August 4, 1932 under the name «Collective-farm newspaper». In 1963 in connection with administrative-territorial reorganization in the Chuvash ASSR the newspaper stopped work.

In 1965 after a reconstruction of the Alikovsky District of the Chuvash ASSR the edition renewed work, but already under a name «On a Lenin way».

Since September 14, 1996 till this day the newspaper is issued under a name «On the life’s way»).

See also
Valinke
Alikovo middle school

Literature
L. A. Efimof, «Элӗк Енӗ» (Alikovsky District), Alikovo, 1994.
"Аликовскому району 75 лет", L. A. Efimof, Cheboksary, 2002.
«Аликовская энциклопедия», editing: L. A. Efimof.,E. L. Efimof, Ananief, Terentief G.K., Cheboksary, 2009, .

References

External links
 Номер газеты
 Аликовской районной газете «Пурнăç çулĕпе» — 75 лет
 Portfolio

Newspapers published in Russia
Publications established in 1932
Publications disestablished in 1962
Newspapers established in 1965
Chuvash-language mass media